T. J. Williams (born September 24, 1982) is an American football tight end. He played high school football at Tarboro High School and Hargrave Military Academy  and played college football for North Carolina State University where he was the leading receiver in 2004 and in 2005.  He was named All ACC 2nd team in 2005.

Williams was drafted with the 1st Compensatory Selection in the 6th round, and 33rd in the 6th round of the 2006 NFL draft by the Tampa Bay Buccaneers.

Williams was released by the Tampa Bay Buccaneers on July 26, 2007.

External links
 NCState profile

1982 births
Living people
People from Tarboro, North Carolina
American football tight ends
NC State Wolfpack football players
Tampa Bay Buccaneers players
Hargrave Military Academy alumni